Stephen Henry Sieradzki (April 5, 1923 – May 1968) was an American football player.  He played college football for Michigan State College (later known as Michigan State University) in 1946 and 1947. He also played also played college baseball for Michigan State. He played professional football in the National Football League for the New York Yankees (NFL) in 1948.  He was released by the Brooklyn Dodgers of the All-American Football Conference in April 1949.

References

1923 births
1968 deaths
American football fullbacks
Michigan State Spartans football players
New York Yankees (NFL) players
Players of American football from Syracuse, New York